The extinct penguin genus Pseudaptenodytes contains the type species P. macraei; smaller bones have been assigned to P. minor, although it is not certain whether they are really from a different species or simply of younger individuals; both taxa are known by an insufficient selection of bones. The fossils of Pseudaptenodytes have been found in deposits in Victoria (Australia) which are of Late Miocene or Early Pliocene age.

References
 Simpson, George Gaylord (1970): Miocene penguins from Victoria, Australia, and Chubut, Argentina. Memoirs of the National Museum of Victoria 31: 17–23.

Bird genera
Extinct penguins
Cenozoic birds
Spheniscidae
Fossil taxa described in 1970
Prehistoric birds of Australia